Famiglia Artigiana Fratelli Ruffatti (Ruffatti Brothers, Family of Artisans) is a manufacturer of pipe organs based in Padua, Italy.

History 
In 1940, Antonio Ruffatti and his two brothers founded the firm of Famiglia Artigiana Fratelli Ruffatti (Ruffatti Brothers, Family of Artisans) the full and original name of the company which remains unchanged. The firm has produced more than five hundred instruments of all sizes, in Europe, North America, Africa, Asia and Australia. The lineage and heritage of Fratelli Ruffatti continues in the twenty-first century with the second generation of Ruffatti brothers, Francesco Ruffatti and Piero Ruffatti, the sons of Antonio, who joined the firm as partners in 1968. Since their father's retirement in 1992, Francesco and Piero have shared the responsibility of running Fratelli Ruffatti.

Design and philosophy
Each Fratelli Ruffatti organ is unique. The tonal planning of each instrument takes into consideration the ideas and musical needs of the customer as well as the space available and the acoustic environment. The primary objective of the aesthetic design is to blend with the existing architecture. Although most Ruffatti instruments utilize the traditional mechanical action, they also produce instruments with electro-pneumatic and all-electric actions. While Ruffatti's continue to refine the sounds of Italian principals and flutes, they have added a wide variety of European and American organ sounds previously unknown in Italy, making their instruments international.

After manufacture and before shipping, each organ is completely assembled in the erecting room of the factory. Every part of the instrument is then checked to avoid any structural work to be completed at the installation site.

Ruffatti installations 

The company is well known for the high profile instruments it has installed over the years - such as the organ at the Crystal Cathedral, the organ at the Shrine of Our Lady of Fatima in Fátima, Portugal, and the 117-rank organ designed by Diane Bish for the Coral Ridge Presbyterian Church in Fort Lauderdale, Florida.

 Spivey Hall, Clayton State University - Atlanta, Georgia, US
 Brigham Young University-Idaho - Rexburg, Idaho, US
 Crystal Cathedral - Garden Grove, California
 Cathedral of Saint Mary of the Assumption - San Francisco, California, US.
 San Francisco Symphony, Davies Symphony Hall - San Francisco, California, US.
 Shrine of Our Lady of Fatima - Fátima, Portugal.
 Friendship Missionary Baptist Church, Charlotte, North Carolina, US.
 Coral Ridge Presbyterian Church, Fort Lauderdale, Florida, US.
 Uppsala Cathedral, Uppsala, Sweden
 Catedral de Nuestra Señora de la Asunción - Aguascalientes, México
 First Presbyterian Church, Naples, Official Website, Installation by Central Music
Centennial Chapel, Olivet Nazarene University - Bourbonnais, Illinois, US.
 St Mel's Cathedral Longford Ireland.

References

External links 
Fratelli Ruffatti  Official website  
Ruffatti Organ at Coral Ridge  
Ruffatti Organ at Brigham Young University-Idaho
 Davies Symphony Hall (San Francisco) Ruffatti organ 
S.F. Symphony's mighty Ruffatti organ to get a big birthday workout -BNet Article

R
Companies based in Padua
Manufacturing companies established in 1940
Italian companies established in 1940
Design companies established in 1940
Musical instrument manufacturing companies of Italy